James Joseph Frawley (September 29, 1936 – January 22, 2019) was an American director and actor. He was a member of the Actors Studio since around 1961. He was best known for directing The Muppet Movie (1979) and The Monkees television series.

Career 
Born in Houston, Texas, Frawley had a short-lived acting career, appearing in supporting roles in film and television from 1963 to 1966. A memorable appearance was the role of Hawaii District Attorney Alvarez in the 1965 Perry Mason episode "The Case of the Feather Cloak". In 1966, he was hired as a director for the new series The Monkees; he ended up directing half of the series' 58 episodes.

He began a career of over four decades as a director. TV series he directed included Cagney & Lacey, Magnum, P.I., Smallville, Ghost Whisperer and Judging Amy, along with many others. He directed occasional feature films and television films, most notably The Muppet Movie in 1979, in which he also had a cameo. His last acting role was that of a bartender in TV's American Gothic in 1996.

He won the Primetime Emmy Award for Outstanding Directing for a Comedy Series in 1967 for the episode "Royal Flush" of The Monkees, and was nominated for the same award the following year for another Monkees episode, "The Devil and Peter Tork".

Frawley died from a heart attack while at home in Indian Wells, California, on January 22, 2019, at the age of 82.

Filmography

Director
The Monkees (1966–1968)
That Girl (1967–1968)
The Christian Licorice Store (1971)
Kid Blue  (1973)
The Big Bus (1976)
Columbo (1977–1978, 1989)
The Eddie Capra Mysteries (1978–1979)
The Muppet Movie (1979)
The Great American Traffic Jam (1980)
Magnum, P.I. (1982–1984)
Scarecrow and Mrs. King (1983–1985)
Cagney & Lacey (1984–1988)
Fraternity Vacation (1985)
Father Dowling Mysteries (1990–1991)
Law & Order (1992–1993)
Picket Fences (1994–1995)
Chicago Hope (1994–1996)
Ally McBeal (1997) - Pilot
On the 2nd Day of Christmas (1997)
Sins of the Mind (1997)
Vengeance Unlimited (1998–1999)
The Three Stooges (2000)
Ghost Whisperer (2005–2006)
Smallville (2001)
Judging Amy (1999–2005)
Notes from the Underbelly (2007)
Dirty Sexy Money (2007)
Grey's Anatomy (2007–2009)
Private Practice (2008–2009)

Actor
 Greenwich Village Story (1963) - Norman
 Ladybug Ladybug (1963) - Truck Driver
 The Troublemaker (1964) - Sal Kelly / Sol Kelly / Judge Kelly
 The Man from U.N.C.L.E. (1964-1966, 2 episodes) - Max / Lieutenant Manuera
 The Outer Limits (1964, Episode: "The Inheritors") - Pvt. Robert Renaldo
 Gunsmoke (1964, S10E7: "Help Me Kitty") - Outlaw Furnas
 The Dick Van Dyke Show (1965, Episode: Fifty-Two, Forty-Five or Work") - Joe Galardi
 McHale's Navy (1966, 2 Episodes) - The German Sergeant / The German Noncom
 The Monkees (1966-1968, 12 episodes) - Voice on telephone / Mr. Schneider / Rudy Bayshore (voice)
 Wild Wild Winter (1966) - Stone
 Hogan's Heroes (1966, Episode: "The Great Impersonation") - Gestapo Captain
 My Favorite Martian (1966, Episode: "Doggone Martin") - Mr. Frisby
 Blue Light (1966, Episode: "Field of Dishonor") - Ehrlich
 I Spy (1966, Episode: "It's All Done with Mirrors") - Greenburg
 Tracks (1976) - Train Passenger
 The Muppet Movie (1979) - Waiter

References

External links
 
 
 

1936 births
2019 deaths
American male film actors
American male television actors
American television directors
Comedy film directors
Male actors from Houston
Film directors from Texas
20th-century American male actors
Primetime Emmy Award winners